Major Aubrey Neil Weinman, OBE CMZS (1897–10 August 1967) was a Ceylonese soldier, civil servant and naturalist. He was the first Director of the Colombo Zoological Gardens (1947-1962).

Early life 
Weinman was born in Colombo, the son of William Algernon Weinman (1869-1922), a stationmaster, and Caroline Maud née Reimers (1872-1961). He attended school at the Royal College, Colombo, where he was a sergeant in the Cadet Corps. Following the outbreak of World War I, he traveled to England in April 1918 to join the British Army. In November he was commissioned as a 2nd Lieutenant in the Indian Army, of the 9th Bhopal Infantry. He saw action on the western front and was wounded in battle. After the war he remained in the reserves.

Career 
He joined the government service and was appointed the second Superintendent of the Colombo Zoological Gardens after it was established in 1939, following the liquidation of Zoological Garden Company in 1936. During his service, new programs included introducing more native and foreign species, education and conservation programs, and improving the facilities and infrastructure.

With the outbreak of World War II in the far east, Weinman was mobilised for service as a Major with the British Army under the Malaya Command. He became a POW after the fall of Singapore. He spent four years in a prisoner of war camp and was liberated at war's end.

On his return he became the inaugural Director of the Colombo Zoological Gardens and remained there until his retirement in 1962.

He was awarded an OBE as part of the 1954 New Year Honours.

Personal life 
After retirement, he moved to Australia with his wife Ena née van Cuylenberg and son David. He died in Perth in 1967.

Bibliography

References

1897 births
1967 deaths
Sri Lankan civil servants
Ceylonese military personnel
Ceylonese prisoners of war in World War II
Officers of the Order of the British Empire
British Army personnel of World War I
British Army personnel of World War II
Alumni of Royal College, Colombo
People from British Ceylon
Australian people of Sri Lankan descent
Ceylonese military personnel of World War I
Ceylonese military personnel of World War II
British Indian Army officers